"Potholes in My Lawn" is the second single by hip hop group De La Soul, released in 1988 from their album 3 Feet High and Rising. The songs were mastered by record mixer and engineer Herb Powers Jr.  The song samples "Magic Mountain" by Eric Burdon & War as well as the signature yodeling and jaw harp on Parliament's "Little Ole Country Boy" off 1970's Osmium.

The song was released in some territories as a double A-side with "Jenifa Taught Me (Derwin's Revenge)".

The song is notable for being the first hip-hop song to be played on Mars, by NASA's Opportunity Rover in 2004.

Track listing
 "Jenifa (Taught Me)" — 4:46
 "Skip 2 My Loop" — 1:07
 "Potholes in My Lawn" — 3:49
 "They Don't Know That the Soul Don't Go for That" — 3:25
 "Derwin" — 3:50

Charts

References

Notes

1988 singles
Songs written by Vincent Mason
Songs written by Kelvin Mercer
Songs written by David Jude Jolicoeur
Songs written by Prince Paul (producer)
De La Soul songs
Song recordings produced by Prince Paul (producer)
1988 songs
Tommy Boy Records singles